Area 15 can refer to:

 Area 15 (Nevada National Security Site) 
 Area15, a retail and entertainment center in Las Vegas
 Brodmann area 15